Alderman is a surname. Notable people with the surname include:

 Albert Alderman (1907–1990), English cricketer
 Clifford Lindsey Alderman (1902–1988), American historical novelist
 Edwin Alderman (1861–1931), American academic and president of three universities (notably UVA, where he served for 27 years)
 Fred Alderman (1905–1998), American athlete
 Geoffrey Alderman (born 1944), British historian
 Grady Alderman (1938–2018), American footballer
 Jack Alderman (1956–2008), American criminal
 Jacob Alderman, elected Mayor of London in 1216
 James Alderman (died 1929), American alcohol smuggler
 John Alderman (17th century), American assassin
 Naomi Alderman (born 1974), British author and novelist
 Terry Alderman (born 1956), Australian cricketer
 Solomon Flagg Alderman (1861-1928), American lawyer and politician

Fictional characters
 Ariel Alderman, a character in the television series Nip/Tuck

References 

English-language surnames
Occupational surnames
English-language occupational surnames